Paradise is an area of Newcastle upon Tyne, Tyne and Wear, England. It is centred on the area at the bottom of Atkinson Road, where it used to meet Scotswood Road.

In the Old Ordnance Survey map of Elswick for 1913 Paradise is just a small part of South Benwell, comprising the north shore of the River Tyne just west of the Armstrong Elswick Works, running up to Paradise Street and Evelyn Gardens, and the bottom half of Atkinson Road.

It was also the location of the Paradise Pit also known as West Benwell Coillery. Which opened in 1819 closed in 1848.

Paradise is mentioned in the full version of the traditional North East folk song the Blaydon Races.

References

Districts of Newcastle upon Tyne